This article details Car Nos. 19–22 of the Manx Electric Railway on the Isle of Man.

These saloon cars, form the fifth batch of power cars, were supplied and delivered in 1899 for the completion of the final section of the line between Laxey Station and Ramsey Plaza. They all remain in service. The four vestibuled cars, known as the Winter Saloons, are the backbone of the fleet of the Manx Electric Railway on the Isle of Man; they are all still in regular service but car 22 was completely rebuilt following a fire at Derby Castle Depôt in 1992 and is now widely considered to be a replica car. They have appeared in a variety of liveries, but suit the 1930s "house" style the best in many people's opinion and it is this guise that they are best known for carrying although they tend to carry several variations of this scheme. Car No. 22 was at one point re-painted in the plain red and cream livery of the island's buses in 1999 in line with management whim, but this ultimately proved unpopular and she now carries the usual livery.  She was also one of the cars selected for re-paint in 1957 upon nationalisation, carrying an experimental green and white livery for some time.  Cars 19 and 20 currently carry the 1950s "austere" livery, with 21 remaining in a hybrid colour scheme of recent years.

Gallery

References

Sources
 Manx Manx Electric Railway Fleetlist (2002) Manx Electric Railway Society
 Island Island Images: Manx Electric Railway Pages (2003) Jon Wornham
 Official Official Tourist Department Page (2009) Isle Of Man Heritage Railways

Manx Electric Railway